Anas Balhous (born 1 January 1999) is a Syrian footballer who plays for Jableh SC, on loan from Al-Wahda in Syria.

He is the younger brother of Mosab Balhous.

Association football midfielders
Living people
Syrian footballers
Al-Karamah players
Sportspeople from Homs
1986 births
Syrian Premier League players